Paul Fitzpatrick Russell (born May 2, 1959) is an American prelate of the Catholic Church who was appointed auxiliary bishop of the Archdiocese of Detroit in May 2022. He was previously the Apostolic Nuncio to Turkey, Turkmenistan, and Azerbaijan and the head of the diplomatic mission to Taiwan. In accordance with those roles, he has the personal title of archbishop.

Biography

Early life 
Paul Russell was born in Greenfield, Massachusetts on May 2, 1959. to Isabelle Fitzpatrick and  Thaddeus Russell. The family lived in Shelburne Falls, Massachusetts, then moved to Malden, Massachusetts and then Willmington, Massachusetts.  In a 2016 interview, Russell said that he first thought of becoming a priest in the first grade.

When Russell was in third grade, his parents divorced and he moved with his mother and siblings to Alpena, Michigan  He then attended the parish school of St. Bernard of Clairvaux.  Russell graduated from Alpena High School in 1977, and then spent a year in France as an exchange student.

After returning from France, Russell entered at Saint John's Seminary in Boston.  Wanting to learn Spanish, he traveled to Peru and Bolivia with the St. James Society, spending a year in South America.  Part of his time there was in language school, the other part was living with a poor family.

Russell returned to St. John Seminary around 1985 to resume his studies. On January 31, 1987, he was ordained a transitional deacon and was assigned to St. Joseph Parish in Wakefield, Massachusetts.

Priesthood 
On June 20, 1987, Russell was ordained to the priesthood for the Archdiocese of Boston by then Archbishop Bernard Law. Russell's first posting after ordination was to Sacred Heart Parish in West Lynn, Massachusetts.  Shortly after arriving at a new assignment at St. Eulalia Parish in Winchester, Massachusetts in 1992, Law asked Russell to become his priest-secretary.  In 1993, Law invited Russell to join the Vatican Diplomatic Service.

Vatican diplomatic service 
In 1993, Russell entered the Pontifical Ecclesiastical Academy, the training facility for Vatican diplomats.  He earned his licentiate and doctorate in canon law at the Pontifical Gregorian University.

On July 1, 1997, Russell entered the diplomatic service, serving first for a short while in Rome working with then-Bishop James Harvey. Later in 1997, Russell was assigned to the Apostolic Nunciature to Ethiopia, Eritrea and Djibouti, stationed in Ethiopia.  He worked there for three years. In 2000, Russell was transferred to the Apostolic Nunciature to Turkey and Turkmenistan.  In 2002, he was sent to the Apostolic Nunciature to Switzerland, when he also assumed pastoral duties of an English-language parish.  In 2005, Russell went to the Apostolic Nunciature to Nigeria, remaining there three years.

On May 2, 2008, Pope Benedict XVI named Russell chargé d'affaires of the Apostolic Nunciature to China (located in Taiwan, the Republic of China), making him the head of the diplomatic mission.

On March 19, 2016, Pope Francis appointed Russell  as Apostolic Nuncio to Türkiye and Turkmenistan . On June 3, 2016, Russell was consecrated titular archbishop of Novi in the Cathedral of the Holy Cross in Boston by Cardinal Seán O'Malley, with Archbishop Allen Vigneron and Archbishop Leo Cushley serving as the co-consecrators. The post of Nuncio to Azerbaijan was added to Russell's responsibilities on April 7, 2018. Russell resigned his post as apostolic nuncio on February 2, 2022.

Archbishop Auxiliary Bishop of Detroit 
On May 23, 2022, Pope Francis named Russell as an auxiliary bishop of Detroit, allowing him to keep the personal title of archbishop. On July 7, 2022, he was installed as auxiliary bishop.  On the occasion when an archbishop in his own right is appointed bishop of a diocesan see, the archbishop is personally referred to as the "Archbishop Bishop of [See Name]." In Russell's very rare circumstance, as an archbishop in his own right being appointed as an auxiliary bishop, he was to be personally be referred to as an "Archbishop Auxiliary Bishop of Detroit."

Russell has a devotion to his mother's cousin Michał Piaszczyński, a beatified priest  who died in the Sachsenhausen concentration camp during World War II. Russell is fluent in French, Italian, Spanish, and German.

See also 

 Catholic Church hierarchy
 Catholic Church in the United States
 Historical list of the Catholic bishops of the United States
 List of Catholic bishops of the United States
 Lists of patriarchs, archbishops, and bishops
 List of heads of the diplomatic missions of the Holy See

Notes

References

External links 
 Roman Catholic Archdiocese of Detroit Official Site

Episcopal succession 

  

1959 births
Living people
People from Greenfield, Massachusetts
People from Alpena, Michigan
Saint John's Seminary (Massachusetts) alumni
Pontifical Ecclesiastical Academy alumni
Pontifical Gregorian University alumni
20th-century American Roman Catholic titular archbishops
Apostolic Nuncios to Turkey
Apostolic Nuncios to Turkmenistan
Apostolic Nuncios to Azerbaijan
Catholics from Massachusetts
Catholics from Michigan
Roman Catholic Archdiocese of Boston
Bishops appointed by Pope Francis